is a Shinto shrine located in Chūō-ku, Kumamoto, Kumamoto, Japan. It is dedicated to Emperor Ōjin, Empress Jingū and Sumiyoshi Sanjin.

History

In 935, Fujisaki Hachimangu was established with the Bunrei of Iwashimizu Hachiman-gū Kyoto, at Chausuyama (now Kumamoto Fujisakidai Baseball Stadium), Kumamoto Castle at the order of Emperor Suzaku. The word Fuji derives from a tale that at the time of establishment, sticking of fuji resulted in fuji  Wisteria taking root and grew. Fujisaki Hachimangu has been respected as the defender of Higo, Kumamoto Prefecture. In 1542, Emperor Go-Nara presented a wooden frame 八幡藤崎宮 which is now engraved over the Torii. Rebuilding of the shrine, 20 years apart, had been made with the order of the Emperor.

In 1877, the shrine was burnt amid the battle of Satsuma Rebellion and was reconstructed at Igawabuchi Machi, the present location. In 1952, the shrine was designated a religious corporation.

Great Festival 

Of the events of the shrine, most known is the parade of Kami with horses in September. This had been called Boshita Festival because seko (followers) followed dancing horses, shouting, "Boshita, boshita." However, this reminded some people of the term "Horoboshita," a phrase or slogan which loosely meant "Korea is destroyed," and supposedly used during the Imjin Wars of the 1590s, when Katō Kiyomasa was part of a campaign to conquer Korea.  Now the festival attendants shout, "Doukai, doukai."

External links of horse festival
horse festival
Horse festival
autumn festival of Fujisaki Hachiman

Treasures
A wooden sitting Hachiman statue and a female god statue are designated as Important Cultural Properties of Japan
. There are old documents, swords and other weapons.

References
Pamphlet of the Fujisaki Hachimanguu on Nov. 26, 2010.

See also

Katou Shrine
List of Shinto shrines

Shinto shrines in Kumamoto Prefecture
Buildings and structures in Kumamoto
Culture articles needing translation from Japanese Wikipedia
Hachiman shrines
Religious buildings and structures completed in 935
Beppyo shrines